The flat-headed shrew (Crocidura planiceps) is a species of mammal in the family Soricidae. It is found in the Democratic Republic of the Congo, Ethiopia, Nigeria, and Uganda. The flat-headed shrew is listed as Data Deficient on the IUCN Red List of Threatened Species.

Sources
 Howell, K. & Hutterer, R. 2004.  Crocidura planiceps.   2006 IUCN Red List of Threatened Species.   Downloaded on 30 July 2007.

Crocidura
Mammals described in 1910
Taxonomy articles created by Polbot
Taxa named by Edmund Heller